Quinn Martins Tales of the Unexpected is an American horror and science fiction anthology television series produced by Quinn Martin, and hosted and narrated by William Conrad. It aired from February 2 to August 24, 1977.

Quinn Martins Tales of the Unexpected aired in the United Kingdom as Twist in the Tale.

Cast

William Conrad hosted and narrated Quinn Martins Tales of the Unexpected. An anthology series, the show told a different story and featured a different cast in each episode.

Unlike the majority of series by Quinn Martin Productions, Quinn Martins Tales of the Unexpected did not have an announcer speaking during the opening credits.

Synopsis

The stories told in Quinn Martin's Tales of the Unexpected are of the horror and science fiction genres. Each episode consists of a single macabre story of the psychological or the occult that explores the vicissitudes of human nature. As its title suggests, each story has an unexpected "twist" or "sting" to maintain the suspense until the very end of the episode and demonstrate to the viewer that ones life is full of twists and turns that cannot be anticipated, and can be horrible.

Each episode begins with everyday images from various episodes of the show, suggesting that the unexpected can be found anywhere, including in the most familiar and common of places. After the opening credits and episode title, Conrad in a voice-over discusses a general topic and then relates it to the central character in the episode. The story involving the character then unfolds, with the character facing a horrific situation that ends with an unexpected twist. At the conclusion of the episode, Conrad returns with another voice-over in which he explains the episodes "sting" or twist, and then applies the story to the general subject first broached after the opening credits.

Production

Eight episodes were produced, one of them two hours long and the rest of them one hour long.

Criticism

In his 1981 non-fiction study of the horror genre, Danse Macabre, the horror fiction novelist Stephen King mentioned Quinn Martins Tales of the Unexpected, writing that it was "interesting" and citing an episode in which a murderer sees his victims return to life on his television set as particularly frightening.

The program drew negative responses from critics. American television standards of the 1970s required limitations on the amount of violence that could be depicted, with too much emotional intensity defined as a form of excessive and unnecessary violence. The show thus had to limit its emotional intensity while filling an hour-long format, leading to what critics described as sluggishly paced stories that lacked many frightening or eerie moments.

The show also was criticized by American literary critic John Kenneth Muir for its lack of originality. Muir wrote that the show tended to reuse already-familiar horror story ideas, some of them considered old as long as several decades earlier. Two episodes, Muir said, were unacknowledged remakes; "The Force of Evil" copied the plot of the 1962 film Cape Fear almost exactly, while "The Nomads" reworked the plot of "Beachhead", the pilot for the 1967-1968 television series The Invaders. The episode "A Hand For Sonny Blue" drew harsh reviews not only for recycling a plot that had been used frequently before – a transplanted limb having an evil character of its own – but also for ending with the "twist" that the entire episode had been merely a dream.

Broadcast history

Tales of the Unexpected premiered on February 2, 1977, and aired on NBC on Wednesdays at 10:00 p.m. until March 9, competing in its time slot with ABC's Charlie's Angels and Baretta. Due to low ratings, the show went into hiatus for five months and returned on August 17, airing two more episodes in its original Wednesday time slot before its cancellation.

On November 29, 1978, NBC aired a two-hour movie entitled Someone's Watching Me!, produced by John Carpenter and starring Lauren Hutton, David Birney, and Adrienne Barbeau. Although NBC promoted it as a "Tales of the Unexpected special," the movie was instead produced by Warner Bros. and was unrelated to the series, which at the time had been off the air for over a year.

Episodes

Proposed additional episodes
Five additional episodes entitled "Something's Out There," "Remember Tomorrow," "A Place of Guilt," "Graves for the Living," and "A Safe Return" were proposed but never produced.

References

NBC original programming
1977 American television series debuts
1977 American television series endings
1970s American anthology television series
1970s American drama television series
English-language television shows
Television series by CBS Studios